Artijan (also Romanized as Ārtījān and Artījān; also known as Artejān) is a village in Sardshir Rural District, in the Central District of Buin va Miandasht County, Isfahan Province, Iran. At the 2006 census, its population was 96, in 32 families.

References 

Populated places in Buin va Miandasht County